The 1925 New South Wales Rugby Football League premiership was the eighteenth season of Sydney’s top-level rugby league club competition, Australia’s first. Nine teams from across the city contested during the season, with South Sydney being crowned premiers by finishing on top of the League.

Season summary
For this season the St George Dragons found a permanent homeground at Earl Park, Arncliffe. The NSWRFL introduced reserve footballs, so that a game could continue even if the ball had been booted out of the stadium.

South Sydney won all their twelve matches during the season, and remain the only club to achieve this in the history of the competition and just one of five to go through a season undefeated. The Rabbitohs made a clean sweep of all three grades.

It was the first of seven premierships South Sydney would win in eight years through to 1932. There were no finals played. By Round 13 South Sydney was in such a dominant position (10 points ahead with five rounds to play) that the NSWRFL curtailed the competition and proceeded to the City Cup knockout tournament, which Souths also won.

Teams
 Balmain, formed on January 23, 1908, at Balmain Town Hall
 Eastern Suburbs, formed on January 24, 1908, at Paddington Town Hall
 Glebe, formed on January 9, 1908
 Newtown, formed on January 14, 1908
 North Sydney, formed on February 7, 1908
 South Sydney, formed on January 17, 1908, at Redfern Town Hall
 St. George, formed on November 8, 1920, at Kogarah School of Arts
 Western Suburbs, formed on February 4, 1908
 University, formed in 1919 at Sydney University

Ladder

See also

References

External links
 Rugby League Tables - Notes The World of Rugby League
 Rugby League Tables - Season 1925 AFL Tables
 Premiership History and Statistics RL1908
 History - Introduction North Sydney Bears
 Results: 1921-30 at rabbitohs.com.au

New South Wales Rugby League premiership
NSWRFL Season